Kansabanik or Kansari is a Hindu caste found from West Bengal, Odisha and Assam state of India. Who are traditionally braziers and coppersmiths by profession. They are one of the fourteen castes belonging to 'Nabasakh' group in Bengal. Kanshabaniks are recognized as Other Backward Class by the Government of West Bengal.

Varna status 
Bṛhaddharma Puraṇa placed Kansabanik and other trading castes in middle-ranking Shudra category.

See also 
 Dhokra
 Karmakar

References 

Bengali Hindu castes
Social groups of West Bengal
Social groups of Odisha